Transfer is a 1966 short film written, shot, produced, edited and directed by David Cronenberg. It features Mort Ritts and Rafe Macpherson and has a runtime of 7 minutes.

In Cronenberg on Cronenberg, edited by Chris Rodley, Cronenberg summarized Transfer as follows:

Home video
The short was included along with Cronenberg's other early films on a bonus disc in Arrow Video's 2015 UK Blu-ray release of Videodrome. This bonus disc, entitled David Cronenberg's Early Works was later released on its own a year later.

References

External links
 

1966 films
English-language Canadian films
Canadian avant-garde and experimental short films
Films directed by David Cronenberg
1960s English-language films
Canadian student films
1960s Canadian films